Horse Sand Fort is one of the larger Royal Commission sea forts in the Solent off Portsmouth, Hampshire, England. The fort is one of four built as part of the Palmerston Forts constructions.

History
Horse Sand Fort was designed by Captain E. H. Stewart, overseen by Assistant Inspector General of Fortifications, Colonel W. F. D. Jervois. Construction work began in 1865, and the fort was completed in 1880, long after the threat of a seaborne invasion from France had passed, at a cost of £424,694.

The original armament was to have been forty five 10-inch and 44 12.5-inch rifled muzzle-loading (RML) guns on the gun floors with 10 12-inch RMLs mounted on the roof in five turrets. In fact the turrets were never built and the limited space meant the 12.5-inch guns had to be operated with less than full charges of powder. In 1882, 12-inch rifled breech-loading guns were placed in alternate bays.

Horse Sand Fort was built on a ring of masonry consisting of large concrete blocks with an outer skin of granite blocks, the interior being filled with clay and shingle and covered with a thick layer of concrete. The floors would have originally provided storage of armoury and guns and the things needed to sustain the men that were stationed on site. The top of the fort consisted of a lighthouse and various chimneys and ventilators. The fort has its own artesian well which provided fresh water. The seaward side of the fort was covered in a heavy iron-armoured plating to protect it from seaborne attack. Access to the fort was by a wooden-decked landing stage supported on cast-iron piles.

In the late 19th century the Solent forts were painted in a black and white chequered paint scheme as an early form of dazzle camouflage. In its unrestored state remains of this pattern are still visible on parts of Horse Sand Fort.

With only a single narrow gap to allow small craft to pass through, this barrier (and a much shorter one running south from No Man's Land Fort towards Ryde Sands) remains as the cost of demolition is deemed too high. A 2020 report stated that during the WW II, "the forts were used to defend the Portsmouth dockyards. Life on site was grim; those serving were deliberately chosen for their inability to swim, to avoid any attempt to escape".

In March 2012, the fort was purchased by Clarenco LLP (previously known as Amazing Retreats)  (which also owned No Man's Land Fort and Spitbank Fort) and was to be converted into a museum.

Clarenco had planned to open Horse Sand Fort for public use in 2016, but as of 2019 Horse Sand, No Man's Land Fort and Spitbank Fort was expected to be put up for auction.

An October 2018 report stated that restoration work on Horse Sands Fort was delayed "by the presence of a resident family of peregrine falcons". In 2020, all three Clarenco-owned Forts were listed for sale. A news item stated that Horse Sand Fort was "a blank canvas, with 100 chambers and living quarters, plus the original gun carriage". In October 2021, it was announced that the fort had been sold to an unnamed buyer for £715,000.

In popular culture
In January 2015, the BBC TV programme Antiques Road Trip included a clip of a visit to the fort.

References

External links 

 Victorian Forts data sheet

Sea forts
Sea Forts in the Solent
Palmerston Forts
Military installations established in 1880
1880 establishments in England